Gudrun Dahl (born 3 April 1948 in Enskede, Sweden) is a Swedish social anthropologist. She grew up in Stockholm and Gothenburg. Since 1989 she has been a professor at Stockholm University, and is currently a professor emerita. Her current research interests lie in "[m]oral arguments in environmental work."

Professor Dahl has published several books, including Having Herds: Pastoral Herd Growth and Household Economy and Suffering Grass: Subsistence and Society of Waso Borana.

She is the daughter of the Swedish geographer Sven Dahl (1912-1979), who himself was the son of the Swedish professor Carl G. Dahl, a pomologist, and Sven's wife, the genealogist Olga Dahl. Her brother, Östen, is also a professor emeritus at Stockholm University, where he teaches linguistics.

References 

Living people
Swedish women academics
Stockholm University
Swedish anthropologists
Swedish women anthropologists
1948 births